The 1973 NCAA University Division Golf Championship was the 35th annual NCAA-sanctioned golf tournament to determine the individual and team national champions of men's collegiate golf at the University Division level in the United States.

The tournament was held at the Stillwater Country Club in Stillwater, Oklahoma.

Florida won the team championship, the Gators' second NCAA title.

Future Masters champion Ben Crenshaw, from Texas, won his third consecutive individual title.  Crenshaw is one of only two players, alongside Phil Mickelson (1989, 1990, and 1992), to win three NCAA individual championships.

Individual results

Individual champion
 Ben Crenshaw, Texas

Team results

Note: Top 10 only
DC = Defending champions

References

NCAA Men's Golf Championship
Golf in Oklahoma
NCAA Golf Championship
NCAA Golf Championship
NCAA Golf Championship